Gaayathridevi Ente Amma is a 1985 Indian Malayalam-language film directed by Sathyan Anthikkad and produced by Prathap S. Pavamani and Leela Raghunath for Sachithra Movies starring Rahman and Seema, supported by Bharath Gopi, M. G. Soman, Rohini, Ashokan and Sukumari playing other important roles.

Cast 

Rahman as Appu
Bharath Gopi as Mahadevan Thampi
M. G. Soman as Mr. Menon 
Seema  as Gayathri Devi
Rohini as Priya
Sankaradi as Nambiar 
Jagathy Sreekumar as Ousepp 
Sukumari as Appu's Friend's Mother 
Adoor Bhavani as Naniyamma 
Shubha as Saudamini 
Master Biju as Master Vensley 
Ashokan as Thomachan 
Bahadoor as Raman Nair 
T. P. Madhavan as George 
Thodupuzha Vasanthi as Ladies Hostel Warden

References

External links
 

1985 films
1980s Malayalam-language films